Payzone is a brand name in the consumer payments industry in the UK and Ireland, used by two distinct and separately-owned businesses, which used to be connected.

Payzone UK is a consumer payments company founded in 1995 and based in Northwich, Cheshire. It rents payment terminals to retailers, including web traders, so that they can accept credit card payments both for goods sold on site and for utilities, bridge tolls, lottery tickets and the like.

Payzone Ireland is based in Sandyford, Dublin, and employs over 80 people in Ireland.  The company was founded in 1989. It previously traded as Alphyra (1999-2007) and ITG Group (1989-1999) and was listed on the LSE under ticker LSE: PAYZ. In 2010 it was acquired by Duke Street in a debt for equity deal,  Payzone was sold to Carlyle Cardinal Ireland for €43.3m in 2015. Carlyle Cardinal Ireland had a total of €290 million fund set up in 2013; one of the companies they invested in was Payzone.

The company processes a variety of electronic transactions services, including debit/credit card transactions mobile phone top ups, M50 motorway toll payments, Leap travel cards, local property tax payments, pay-by-phone parking, pre-paid and bill pay utility, and parcel collection services.

References

Payment service providers
Financial services companies established in 1989
Financial services companies of Ireland